The North Pacific Football League is the collaboration name for two separate but related minor American football leagues - the Pacific Football League and Northern California League - that operated in the Pacific Northwest region, between 1963 to 1966. The leagues published combined all-star team every year, but there was no inter-league or playoff play, except the 1966 season, when both league champions played for the "Pacific Coast Championship". 

The leagues supplied five of the seven members of the Continental Football League "Pacific Division", resulting in leagues disbandment after the 1966 season. It was the second football league (after the United Football League) to operate teams in both the United States and Canada.

History
The Pacific Football League had a special "8-Point rule", stated that if a team was trailing by eight or more points, they could receive a kickoff from their opponent rather than kickoff. The league commissioner was former Hollywood Stars player Joe Huston with involvement of Frank Leahy Jr. during the 1966 season. 

The North Pacific Football League featured some notable names, including former Washington Redskins WR Hugh Smith, future Oakland Raiders Chon Gallegos (1965 NCL MVP), Grey Cup champion Pete Ohler, Kermit Jorgensen (two-time league MVP), former Oregon Ducks stars Mike Brundage and Paul Burleson, Raye Renfro and future Humboldt State Lumberjacks football head coach Mike Dolby.

After the 1966 season Eugene Bombers, Sacramento Lancers, San Jose Apaches, Seattle Ramblers and Victoria Steelers
 joined the newly formed Continental Football League "Pacific Division". Portland Thunderbirds declined an opportunity to join the CoFL due to financial concerns.

1963

1964
The Bellingham Jets dropped out of the league mid-season and forfeited the last four games.

1965
It was the first year that two leagues coexist. Edmonds Warriors finished first in the PFL and San Jose Apaches won NCL title after beating Redwood City Ramblers in the league final. Kermit Jorgensen (RB, Edmonds) and Chon Gallegos (QB, San Jose) won their respective league MVP titles. Frank Leahy Jr., son of the former Notre Dame coach, was appointed head coach for Lake Oswego Thunderbirds. 

The North Pacific Football League changed its name to Northwest International Football League after adding Canada's Vancouver Kats. Alas, the Kats disbanded mid-season failing to score in any league games, became Rugby club and forfeited the last four games.

NCL Championship Game: San Jose 7, Redwood City 6

1966
Portland Thunderbirds signed a working agreement with the Denver Broncos for players development. 

The Bombers chose not to play the 1966 PFL playoffs due to financial concerns.

Pacific Coast Championship Game  
Pacific Football League vs. Northern California League  
Seattle Ramblers 48, San Jose Apaches 13  
Kermit Jorgensen (RB, Seattle) won the Northern Pacific Football League MVP title.

See also 
Continental Football League
Pacific Coast Professional Football League

References 

Defunct American football leagues in the United States
Sports leagues established in 1963
1963 establishments in the United States
1966 disestablishments in the United States